Samuel Odom (April 23, 1919 – August 14, 1977) was an American Negro league pitcher in the 1940s.

A native of Gordon, Georgia, Odom played for the Indianapolis Clowns in 1946. He died in Cincinnati, Ohio in 1977 at age 58.

References

External links
 and Seamheads

1919 births
1977 deaths
Indianapolis Clowns players
Baseball pitchers
Baseball players from Georgia (U.S. state)
People from Wilkinson County, Georgia
20th-century African-American sportspeople